Anna Taylor (born 7 August 1991) is a New Zealand Para cyclist. She competed in Para cycling – track at the 2020 Summer Paralympics, becoming New Zealand Paralympian #225.

Hometown 
Taylor lives in Cambridge in the Waikato region of New Zealand.

Medal record 
Taylor made her international debut at the 2019 UCI Para Cycling Track World Championships, and her Paralympic debut at the Tokyo 2020 Paralympic Games in 2021.

In Tokyo 2020, Taylor placed 5th in the Women’s C4 3000m Individual Pursuit. Her time of 3:54.167 was a Paralympic Record but was later beaten by another competitor. Taylor also placed 8th in the Women’s C4-5 500m Time Trial Final.

Taylor earned her first World Championships medals at the 2022 UCI Para Cycling Track World Championships, where she earned bronze in the 500m Time Trial and bronze in the Omnium.

Impairment and classification 
Taylor was given a C4 classification after an Acute Cauda Equina Syndrome in 2016 – severe disc prolapse that compressed the spinal cord. She underwent emergency surgery and has subsequent weakness in the left leg, and minor weakness in the right.

References 

Paralympic cyclists of New Zealand
New Zealand female cyclists
1981 births
Living people
21st-century New Zealand women